Thy1 may refer to:
 CD90, formal name of Thymocyte antigen 1, a cluster of differentiation 90
 Thymidylate synthase (FAD), an enzyme
 Thymidylate synthase complementing protein 1 which complements but shows no homology to thymidylate synthase